Allan Maldonado (born 22 May 1994) is a Guatemalan karateka. At the 2019 Pan American Games held in Lima, Peru, he won one of the bronze medals in the men's kumite 75kg event. He has been coached by Cheili González.

In 2021, he competed at the World Olympic Qualification Tournament held in Paris, France hoping to qualify for the 2020 Summer Olympics in Tokyo, Japan.

He won the silver medal in the men's 75kg event at the 2022 Bolivarian Games held in Valledupar, Colombia.

References 

Living people
1994 births
Place of birth missing (living people)
Guatemalan male karateka
Pan American Games medalists in karate
Pan American Games bronze medalists for Guatemala
Medalists at the 2019 Pan American Games
Karateka at the 2019 Pan American Games
Competitors at the 2018 Central American and Caribbean Games
Central American and Caribbean Games gold medalists for Guatemala
Central American and Caribbean Games medalists in karate
21st-century Guatemalan people